Christopher Kinney (born November 9, 1988) is an American bobsledder. He competed in the four-man event at the 2018 Winter Olympics. In 2020, he came out as bisexual.

References

External links
 

1988 births
American male bobsledders
Bisexual sportspeople
Bobsledders at the 2018 Winter Olympics
LGBT bobsledders
American LGBT sportspeople
Living people
Olympic bobsledders of the United States
Place of birth missing (living people)
21st-century LGBT people